William Patrick Aird (died 31 October 1931) was an Irish politician. An auctioneer, farmer, and merchant, he was elected to Dáil Éireann as a Cumann na nGaedheal Teachta Dála (TD) for the Leix–Offaly constituency at the September 1927 general election. He died during the 6th Dáil but no by-election was held for his seat.

References

Year of birth missing
1931 deaths
Cumann na nGaedheal TDs
Members of the 6th Dáil
20th-century Irish farmers
21st-century Irish farmers